The gulden a currency denomination of Neuchâtel equal to 21 batz until 1850. Neuchâtel's basic currency unit was the livre (later franc), divided into 10 batz or 40 kreuzer. The French silver écu was worth 42 batz or 2 gulden. It was replaced by the Swiss franc.

Coins
After 1799, only the billon coins were issued, with the last coins struck in 1818.

References

External links

Modern obsolete currencies
Currencies of Switzerland
1850 disestablishments
Canton of Neuchâtel